Balsam is an unincorporated community in Iron County, in the U.S. state of Michigan.

History
A post office was established at Balsam in 1909, and it was discontinued months later in that same year. The community was named for the balsam fir trees lining the original town site.

References

Unincorporated communities in Iron County, Michigan
Unincorporated communities in Michigan